The Pharisees were a Jewish social movement and a school of thought in the Levant during the time of Second Temple Judaism. After the destruction of the Second Temple in 70 CE, Pharisaic beliefs became the foundational, liturgical, and ritualistic basis for Rabbinic Judaism.

Conflicts between Pharisees and Sadducees took place in the context of much broader and longstanding social and religious conflicts among Jews, made worse by the Roman conquest. One conflict was cultural, between those who favored Hellenization (the Sadducees) and those who resisted it (the Pharisees). Another was juridical-religious, between those who emphasized the importance of the Temple with its rites and services, and those who emphasized the importance of other Mosaic Laws. A specifically religious point of conflict involved different interpretations of the Torah and how to apply it to current Jewish life, with Sadducees recognizing only the Written Torah and rejecting Prophets, Writings, and doctrines such as the Oral Torah and the resurrection of the dead.

Josephus, believed by many historians to have been a Pharisee, estimated the total Pharisee population before the fall of the Second Temple to be around 6,000. He claimed that the Pharisees’ influence over the common people was so great that anything they said against the king or the high priest was believed, apparently in contrast to the more elite Sadducees, who were the upper class. Pharisees claimed Mosaic authority for their interpretation of Jewish religious law, while Sadducees represented the authority of the priestly privileges and prerogatives established since the days of Solomon, when Zadok, their ancestor, officiated as high priest.

Pharisees have also been made notable by numerous references to them in the New Testament. While the writers record hostilities between some of the Pharisees and Jesus, there are also several references in the New Testament to Pharisees who believed in him, including Nicodemus, who said it is known Jesus is a teacher sent from God, Joseph of Arimathea, who was his disciple, and an unknown number of "those of the party of the Pharisees who believed", among them the Apostle Paul – a student of Gamaliel, who warned the Sanhedrin that opposing the disciples of Jesus could prove to be tantamount to opposing God – even after becoming an apostle of Jesus Christ.

Etymology
"Pharisee" is derived from Ancient Greek , from Aramaic , plural , meaning "set apart, separated", related to Hebrew , plural , the Qal passive participle of the verb . This may be a reference to their separation from the Gentiles, sources of ritual impurity, or from non-religious Jews. Alternatively, it may have a particular political meaning as "separatists" due to their division from the Sadducee elite, with Yitzhak Isaac Halevi characterizing the Sadducees and Pharisees as political sects, not religious ones.

Sources 
The first historical mention of the Pharisees and their beliefs comes in the four gospels and the Book of Acts, in which both their meticulous adherence to their interpretation of the Torah as well as their eschatological views are described. A later historical mention of the Pharisees comes from the Jewish-Roman historian Josephus (37–100 CE) in a description of the "four schools of thought", or "four sects", into which he divided the Jews in the 1st century CE. (The other schools were the Essenes, who were generally apolitical and who may have emerged as a sect of dissident priests who rejected either the Seleucid-appointed or the Hasmonean high priests as illegitimate; the Sadducees, the main antagonists of the Pharisees; and the "fourth philosophy".) Other sects emerged at this time, such as the Early Christians in Jerusalem and the Therapeutae in Egypt, if they were Jews, which is unclear.

1 and 2 Maccabees, two deuterocanonical books in the Bible, focus on the Jews' revolt against the Seleucid king Antiochus IV Epiphanes and concludes with the defeat of his general, Nicanor, in 161 BCE by Judas Maccabeus, the hero of the work. It included several theological points - prayer for the dead, the last judgment, intercession of saints, and martyrology. The non-canonical text known as the Gospel of Peter also alludes to the Pharisees.

Judah haNasi redacted the Mishnah, an authoritative codification of Pharisaic interpretations, around 200 CE. Most of the authorities quoted in the Mishnah lived after the destruction of the Temple in 70 CE; it thus marks the beginning of the transition from Pharisaic to Rabbinic Judaism. The Mishnah was supremely important because it compiled the oral interpretations and traditions of the Pharisees and later on the Rabbis into a single authoritative text, thus allowing oral tradition within Judaism to survive the destruction of the Second Temple.

However, none of the Rabbinic sources include identifiable eyewitness accounts of the Pharisees and their teachings.

History

From 
The deportation and exile of an unknown number of Jews of the ancient Kingdom of Judah to Babylon by Nebuchadnezzar II, starting with the first deportation in 597 BCE and continuing after the fall of Jerusalem and destruction of the Temple in 587 BCE, resulted in dramatic changes to Jewish culture and religion.

In 539 BCE the Persians conquered Babylon, and in 537 BCE Cyrus the Great allowed Jews to return to Judea and rebuild the Temple. He did not, however, allow the restoration of the Judean monarchy, which left the Judean priests as the dominant authority. Without the constraining power of the monarchy, the authority of the Temple in civic life was amplified. It was around this time that the Sadducee party emerged as the party of priests and allied elites. However, the Second Temple, which was completed in 515 BCE, had been constructed under the auspices of a foreign power, and there were lingering questions about its legitimacy. This provided the condition for the development of various sects or "schools of thought," each of which claimed exclusive authority to represent "Judaism," and which typically shunned social intercourse, especially marriage, with members of other sects. In the same period, the council of sages known as the Sanhedrin may have codified and canonized the latter sections of the Hebrew Bible (Nakh), from which, following the return from Babylon, the Torah was read publicly on market-days.

The Temple was no longer the only institution for Jewish religious life. After the building of the Second Temple in the time of Ezra the Scribe, the houses of study and worship remained important secondary institutions in Jewish life. Outside Judea, the synagogue was often called a house of prayer. While most Jews could not regularly attend the Temple service, they could meet at the synagogue for morning, afternoon and evening prayers. On Mondays, Thursdays and Shabbats, a weekly Torah portion was read publicly in the synagogues, following the tradition of public Torah readings instituted by Ezra.

Although priests controlled the rituals of the Temple, the scribes and sages, later called rabbis (Hebrew for "Teacher/master"), dominated the study of the Torah. These men maintained an oral tradition that they believed had originated at Mount Sinai alongside the Torah of Moses; a God-given interpretation of the Torah.

The Hellenistic period of Jewish history began when Alexander the Great conquered Persia in 332 BCE. The rift between the priests and the sages developed during this time, when Jews faced new political and cultural struggles. After Alexander's death in 323 BCE, Judea was ruled by the Egyptian-Hellenic Ptolemies until 198 BCE, when the Syrian-Hellenic Seleucid Empire, under Antiochus III, seized control. Then, in 167 BCE, the Seleucid king Antiochus IV invaded Judea, entered the Temple, and stripped it of money and ceremonial objects. He imposed a program of forced Hellenization, requiring Jews to abandon their own laws and customs, thus precipitating the Maccabean Revolt. Jerusalem was liberated in 165 BCE and the Temple was restored. In 141 BCE an assembly of priests and others affirmed Simon Maccabeus as high priest and leader, in effect establishing the Hasmonean dynasty.

Emergence of the Pharisees

After defeating the Seleucid forces, Judas Maccabaeus's nephew John Hyrcanus established a new monarchy in the form of the priestly Hasmonean dynasty in 152 BCE, thus establishing priests as political as well as religious authorities. Although the Hasmoneans were considered heroes for resisting the Seleucids, their reign lacked the legitimacy conferred by descent from the Davidic dynasty of the First Temple era.

The Pharisee ("separatist") party emerged largely out of the group of scribes and sages. It may refer to their separation from Gentiles, sources of ritual impurity or from irreligious Jews. The Pharisees, among other Jewish sects, were active from the middle of the second century BCE until the destruction of the Temple in 70 CE. Josephus first mentions them in connection with Jonathan, the successor of Judas Maccabeus. One of the factors that distinguished the Pharisees from other groups prior to the destruction of the Temple was their belief that all Jews had to observe the purity laws (which applied to the Temple service) outside the Temple. The major difference, however, was the continued adherence of the Pharisees to the laws and traditions of the Jewish people in the face of assimilation. As Josephus noted, the Pharisees were considered the most expert and accurate expositors of Jewish law.

Josephus indicates that the Pharisees received the backing and good-will of the common people, apparently in contrast to the more elite Sadducees associated with the ruling classes. In general, whereas the Sadducees were aristocratic monarchists, the Pharisees were eclectic, popular, and more democratic. The Pharisaic position is exemplified by the assertion that "A learned  takes precedence over an ignorant High Priest." (A , according to the Pharisaic definition, is an outcast child born of a forbidden relationship, such as adultery or incest, in which marriage of the parents could not lawfully occur. The word is often, but incorrectly, translated as "illegitimate".)

Sadducees rejected the Pharisaic tenet of an Oral Torah, creating two Jewish understandings of the Torah. An example of this differing approach is the interpretation of, "an eye in place of an eye". The Pharisaic understanding was that the value of an eye was to be paid by the perpetrator. In the Sadducees' view the words were given a more literal interpretation, in which the offender's eye would be removed.

The sages of the Talmud see a direct link between themselves and the Pharisees, and historians generally consider Pharisaic Judaism to be the progenitor of Rabbinic Judaism, that is normative, mainstream Judaism after the destruction of the Second Temple. All mainstream forms of Judaism today consider themselves heirs of Rabbinic Judaism and, ultimately, the Pharisees.

The Hasmonean period

Although the Pharisees did not support the wars of expansion of the Hasmoneans and the forced conversions of the Idumeans, the political rift between them became wider when a Pharisee named Eleazar insulted the Hasmonean ethnarch John Hyrcanus at his own table, suggesting that he should abandon his role as High Priest due to a rumour, probably untrue, that he had been conceived while his mother was a prisoner of war. In response, he distanced himself from the Pharisees.

After the death of John Hyrcanus, his younger son Alexander Jannaeus made himself king and openly sided with the Sadducees by adopting their rites in the Temple. His actions caused a riot in the Temple, and led to a brief civil war that ended with a bloody repression of the Pharisees. However, on his deathbed Jannaeus advised his widow, Salome Alexandra, to seek reconciliation with the Pharisees. Her brother was Shimon ben Shetach, a leading Pharisee. Josephus attests that Salome was favorably inclined toward the Pharisees, and their political influence grew tremendously under her reign, especially in the Sanhedrin or Jewish Council, which they came to dominate.

After her death her elder son Hyrcanus II was generally supported by the Pharisees. Her younger son, Aristobulus II, was in conflict with Hyrcanus, and tried to seize power. The Pharisees seemed to be in a vulnerable position at this time. The conflict between the two sons culminated in a civil war that ended when the Roman general Pompey intervened, and captured Jerusalem in 63 BCE.

Josephus' account may overstate the role of the Pharisees. He reports elsewhere that the Pharisees did not grow to power until the reign of Queen Salome Alexandra. As Josephus was himself a Pharisee, his account might represent a historical creation meant to elevate the status of the Pharisees during the height of the Hasmonean Dynasty.

Later texts like the Mishnah and the Talmud record a host of rulings by rabbis, some of whom are believed to be from among the Pharisees, concerning sacrifices and other ritual practices in the Temple, torts, criminal law, and governance. In their day, the influence of the Pharisees over the lives of the common people was strong and their rulings on Jewish law were deemed authoritative by many.

The Roman period

According to Josephus, the Pharisees appeared before Pompey asking him to interfere and restore the old priesthood while abolishing the royalty of the Hasmoneans altogether. Pharisees also opened Jerusalem's gates to the Romans, and actively supported them against the Sadducean faction. When the Romans finally broke the entrance to the Jerusalem's Temple, they killed the priests who were officiating the Temple services on Saturday. They regarded Pompey's defilement of the Temple in Jerusalem as a divine punishment of Sadducean misrule. Pompey ended the monarchy in 63 BCE and named Hyrcanus II high priest and ethnarch (a lesser title than "king"). Six years later Hyrcanus was deprived of the remainder of political authority and ultimate jurisdiction was given to the Proconsul of Syria, who ruled through Hyrcanus's Idumaean associate Antipater, and later Antipater's two sons Phasael (military governor of Judea) and Herod (military governor of Galilee). In 40 BCE Aristobulus's son Antigonus overthrew Hyrcanus and named himself king and high priest, and Herod fled to Rome.

In Rome, Herod sought the support of Mark Antony and Octavian, and secured recognition by the Roman Senate as king, confirming the termination of the Hasmonean dynasty. According to Josephus, Sadducean opposition to Herod led him to treat the Pharisees favorably. Herod was an unpopular ruler, perceived as a Roman puppet. Despite his restoration and expansion of the Second Temple, Herod's notorious treatment of his own family and of the last Hasmonaeans further eroded his popularity. According to Josephus, the Pharisees ultimately opposed him and thus fell victims (4 BCE) to his bloodthirstiness. The family of Boethus, whom Herod had raised to the high-priesthood, revived the spirit of the Sadducees, and thenceforth the Pharisees again had them as antagonists.

While it stood, the Second Temple remained the center of Jewish ritual life. According to the Torah, Jews were required to travel to Jerusalem and offer sacrifices at the Temple three times a year: Pesach (Passover), Shavuot (the Feast of Weeks), and Sukkot (the Feast of Tabernacles). The Pharisees, like the Sadducees, were politically quiescent, and studied, taught, and worshiped in their own way. At this time serious theological differences emerged between the Sadducees and Pharisees. The notion that the sacred could exist outside the Temple, a view central to the Essenes, was shared and elevated by the Pharisees.

Legacy
At first the values of the Pharisees developed through their sectarian debates with the Sadducees; then they developed through internal, non-sectarian debates over the law as an adaptation to life without the Temple, and life in exile, and eventually, to a more limited degree, life in conflict with Christianity. These shifts mark the transformation of Pharisaic to Rabbinic Judaism.

Beliefs
No single tractate of the key Rabbinic texts, the Mishnah and the Talmud, is devoted to theological issues; these texts are concerned primarily with interpretations of Jewish law, and anecdotes about the sages and their values. Only one chapter of the Mishnah deals with theological issues; it asserts that three kinds of people will have no share in "the world to come:" those who deny the resurrection of the dead, those who deny the divinity of the Torah, and Epicureans (who deny divine supervision of human affairs). Another passage suggests a different set of core principles: normally, a Jew may violate any law to save a life, but in Sanhedrin 74a, a ruling orders Jews to accept martyrdom rather than violate the laws against idolatry, murder, or adultery. (Judah haNasi, however, said that Jews must "be meticulous in small religious duties as well as large ones, because you do not know what sort of reward is coming for any of the religious duties," suggesting that all laws are of equal importance).

Monotheism
One belief central to the Pharisees which was shared by all Jews of the time is monotheism. According to the Mishna, these passages were recited in the Temple along with the twice-daily  offering; Jews in the diaspora, who did not have access to the Temple, recited these passages in their houses of assembly. According to the Mishnah and Talmud, the men of the Great Assembly instituted the requirement that Jews both in Judea and in the diaspora pray three times a day (morning, afternoon and evening), and include in their prayers a recitation of these passages in the morning and evening prayers.

Wisdom
Pharisaic wisdom was compiled in one book of the Mishna, . The Pharisaic attitude is perhaps best exemplified by a story about the sages Hillel the Elder and Shammai, who both lived in the latter half of the 1st century BCE. A Gentile once challenged Shammai to teach him the wisdom of the Torah while he stood on one foot. Shammai drove him away. The same gentile approached Hillel and asked of him the same thing. Hillel chastised him gently by saying, "What is hateful to you, do not do to your fellow. That is the whole Torah; the rest is the explanation – now go and study."

Free will and predestination
According to Josephus, whereas the Sadducees believed that people have total free will and the Essenes believed that all of a person's life is predestined, the Pharisees believed that people have free will but that God also has foreknowledge of human destiny. This also accords with the statement in  3:19, "Rabbi Akiva said: All is foreseen, but freedom of choice is given". According to Josephus, Pharisees were further distinguished from the Sadducees in that Pharisees believed in the resurrection of the dead.

The afterlife

Unlike the Sadducees, who are generally held to have rejected any existence after death, the sources vary on the beliefs of the Pharisees on the afterlife. According to the New Testament the Pharisees believed in the resurrection of the dead. According to Josephus, who himself was a Pharisee, the Pharisees held that only the soul was immortal and the souls of good people would be resurrected or reincarnated and "pass into other bodies," while "the souls of the wicked will suffer eternal punishment." Paul the Apostle declared himself to be a Pharisee even after his belief in Jesus Christ.

Practices

A kingdom of priests
Fundamentally, the Pharisees continued a form of Judaism that extended beyond the Temple, applying Jewish law to mundane activities in order to sanctify the everyday world. This was a more participatory (or "democratic") form of Judaism, in which rituals were not monopolized by an inherited priesthood but rather could be performed by all adult Jews individually or collectively; whose leaders were not determined by birth but by scholarly achievement.

Many, including some scholars, have characterized the Sadducees as a sect that interpreted the Torah literally, and the Pharisees as interpreting the Torah liberally. R' Yitzhak Isaac Halevi suggests that this was not, in fact, a matter of religion. He claims that the complete rejection of Judaism would not have been tolerated under the Hasmonean rule and therefore Hellenists maintained that they were rejecting not Judaism but Rabbinic law. Thus, the Sadducees were in fact a political party not a religious sect. However, according to Jacob Neusner, this view is a distortion. He suggests that two things fundamentally distinguished the Pharisaic from the Sadducean approach to the Torah. First, Pharisees believed in a broad and literal interpretation of Exodus (19:3–6), "you shall be my own possession among all peoples; for all the earth is mine, and you shall be to me a kingdom of priests and a holy nation," and the words of 2 Maccabees (2:17): "God gave all the people the heritage, the kingdom, the priesthood, and the holiness."

The Pharisees believed that the idea that all of the children of Israel were to be like priests was expressed elsewhere in the Torah, for example, when the Law itself was transferred from the sphere of the priesthood to every man in Israel. Moreover, the Torah already provided ways for all Jews to lead a priestly life: the laws of kosher animals were perhaps intended originally for the priests, but were extended to the whole people; similarly the prohibition of cutting the flesh in mourning for the dead. The Pharisees believed that all Jews in their ordinary life, and not just the Temple priesthood or Jews visiting the Temple, should observe rules and rituals concerning purification.

The Oral Torah

The standard view is that the Pharisees differed from Sadducees in the sense that they accepted the Oral Torah in addition to the Scripture. Anthony J. Saldarini argues that this assumption has neither implicit nor explicit evidence. A critique of the ancient interpretations of the Bible are distant from what modern scholars consider literal. Saldarini states that the Oral Torah did not come about until the third century CE, although there was an unstated idea about it in existence. Every Jewish community in a way possessed their own version of the Oral Torah which governed their religious practices. Josephus stated that the Sadducees only followed literal interpretations of the Torah. To Saldarini, this only means that the Sadducees followed their own way of Judaism and rejected the Pharisaic version of Judaism. To Rosemary Ruether, the Pharisaic proclamation of the Oral Torah was their way of freeing Judaism from the clutches of Aaronite priesthood, represented by the Sadducees. The Oral Torah was to remain oral but was later given a written form. It did not refer to the Torah in a status as a commentary, rather had its own separate existence which allowed Pharisaic innovations.

The sages of the Talmud believed that the Oral law was simultaneously revealed to Moses at Sinai, and the product of debates among rabbis. Thus, one may conceive of the "Oral Torah" as both based on the fixed text and as an ongoing process of analysis and argument in which God is actively involved; it was this ongoing process that was revealed at Sinai along with the scripture, and by participating in this ongoing process rabbis and their students are actively participating in God's ongoing act of revelation.

As Jacob Neusner has explained, the schools of the Pharisees and rabbis were and are holy:
"...because there men achieve sainthood through study of Torah and imitation of the conduct of the masters. In doing so, they conform to the heavenly paradigm, the Torah believed to have been created by God "in his image," revealed at Sinai, and handed down to their own teachers ... If the masters and disciples obey the divine teaching of Moses, "our rabbi," then their society, the school, replicates on earth the heavenly academy, just as the disciple incarnates the heavenly model of Moses, "our rabbi." The rabbis believe that Moses was (and the Messiah will be) a rabbi, God dons phylacteries, and the heavenly court studies Torah precisely as does the earthly one, even arguing about the same questions. These beliefs today may seem as projections of rabbinical values onto heaven, but the rabbis believe that they themselves are projections of heavenly values onto earth. The rabbis thus conceive that on earth they study Torah just as God, the angels, and Moses, "our rabbi," do in heaven. The heavenly schoolmen are even aware of Babylonian scholastic discussions, so they require a rabbi's information about an aspect of purity taboos.

The commitment to relate religion to daily life through the law has led some (notably, Saint Paul and Martin Luther) to infer that the Pharisees were more legalistic than other sects in the Second Temple Era. The authors of the Gospels present Jesus as speaking harshly against some Pharisees (Josephus does claim that the Pharisees were the "strictest" observers of the law). Yet, as Neusner has observed, Pharisaism was but one of many "Judaisms" in its day, and its legal interpretation are what set it apart from the other sects of Judaism.

Innovators or preservers
The Mishna in the beginning of Avot and (in more detail) Maimonides in his Introduction to  records a chain of tradition from Moses at Mount Sinai down to R' Ashi, redactor of the Talmud and last of the Amoraim. This chain of tradition includes the interpretation of unclear statements in the Bible (e.g. that the "fruit of a beautiful tree" refers to a citron as opposed to any other fruit), the methods of textual exegesis (the disagreements recorded in the Mishna and Talmud generally focus on methods of exegesis), and Laws with Mosaic authority that cannot be derived from the Biblical text (these include measurements (e.g. what amount of a non-kosher food must one eat to be liable), the amount and order of the scrolls to be placed in the phylacteries, etc.).

The Pharisees were also innovators in that they enacted specific laws as they saw necessary according to the needs of the time. These included prohibitions to prevent an infringement of a biblical prohibition (e.g. one does not take a Lulav on Shabbat "Lest one carry it in the public domain") called , among others. Much of the legal system is based on "what the sages constructed via logical reasoning and from established practice". Also, the blessings before meals and the wording of the Amidah. These are known as Takanot. The Pharisees based their authority to innovate on the verses: "....according to the word they tell you... according to all they instruct you. According to the law they instruct you and according to the judgment they say to you, you shall do; you shall not divert from the word they tell you, either right or left" (Deuteronomy 17:10–11) (see Encyclopedia Talmudit entry "Divrei Soferim").

In an interesting twist, Abraham Geiger posits that the Sadducees were the more hidebound adherents to an ancient Halacha whereas the Pharisees were more willing to develop Halacha as the times required. See however, Bernard Revel's "Karaite Halacha" which rejects many of Geiger's proofs.

Significance of debate and study of the law
Just as important as (if not more important than) any particular law was the value the rabbis placed on legal study and debate. The sages of the Talmud believed that when they taught the Oral Torah to their students, they were imitating Moses, who taught the law to the children of Israel. Moreover, the rabbis believed that "the heavenly court studies Torah precisely as does the earthly one, even arguing about the same questions." Thus, in debating and disagreeing over the meaning of the Torah or how best to put it into practice, no rabbi felt that he (or his opponent) was rejecting God or threatening Judaism; on the contrary, it was precisely through such arguments that the rabbis imitated and honored God.

One sign of the Pharisaic emphasis on debate and differences of opinion is that the Mishnah and Talmud mark different generations of scholars in terms of different pairs of contending schools. In the first century, for example, the two major Pharisaic schools were those of Hillel and Shammai. After Hillel died in 20 CE, Shammai assumed the office of president of the Sanhedrin until he died in 30 CE. Followers of these two sages dominated scholarly debate over the following decades. Although the Talmud records the arguments and positions of the school of Shammai, the teachings of the school of Hillel were ultimately taken as authoritative.

Comparison
Comparison of the Jewish sects:

From Pharisees to rabbis

Following the Jewish–Roman wars, revolutionaries like the Zealots had been crushed by the Romans, and had little credibility (the last Zealots died at Masada in 73 CE). Similarly, the Sadducees, whose teachings were closely connected to the Temple, disappeared with the destruction of the Second Temple in 70 CE. The Essenes too disappeared, perhaps because their teachings so diverged from the concerns of the times, perhaps because they were sacked by the Romans at Qumran.

Of all the major Second Temple sects, only the Pharisees remained. Their vision of Jewish law as a means by which ordinary people could engage with the sacred in their daily lives was a position meaningful to the majority of Jews. Such teachings extended beyond ritual practices. According to the classic midrash in Avot D'Rabbi Nathan (4:5):

Following the destruction of the Temple, Rome governed Judea through a Procurator at Caesarea and a Jewish Patriarch and levied the Fiscus Judaicus. Yohanan ben Zakkai, a leading Pharisee, was appointed the first Patriarch (the Hebrew word, Nasi, also means prince, or president), and he reestablished the Sanhedrin at Yavneh (see the related Council of Jamnia) under Pharisee control. Instead of giving tithes to the priests and sacrificing offerings at the (now-destroyed) Temple, the rabbis instructed Jews to give charity. Moreover, they argued that all Jews should study in local synagogues, because Torah is "the inheritance of the congregation of Jacob" (Deuteronomy 33:4).

After the destruction of the First Temple, Jews believed that God would forgive them and enable them to rebuild the Temple an event that actually occurred within three generations. After the destruction of the Second Temple, Jews wondered whether this would happen again. When the Emperor Hadrian threatened to rebuild Jerusalem as a pagan city dedicated to Jupiter, in 132, Aelia Capitolina, some of the leading sages of the Sanhedrin supported a rebellion led by Simon Bar Kosiba (later known as Bar Kokhba), who established a short-lived independent state that was conquered by the Romans in 135. With this defeat, Jews' hopes that the Temple would be rebuilt were crushed. Nonetheless, belief in a Third Temple remains a cornerstone of Jewish belief.

Romans forbade Jews to enter Jerusalem (except for the day of Tisha B'Av), and forbade any plan to rebuild the Temple. Instead, it took over the Province of Judea directly, renaming it Syria Palaestina, and renaming Jerusalem Aelia Capitolina. Romans did eventually reconstitute the Sanhedrin under the leadership of Judah haNasi (who claimed to be a descendant of King David). They conferred the title of "Nasi" as hereditary, and Judah's sons served both as Patriarch and as heads of the Sanhedrin.

Post-Temple developments
According to historian Shaye Cohen, by the time three generations had passed after the destruction of the Second Temple, most Jews concluded that the Temple would not be rebuilt during their lives, nor in the foreseeable future. Jews were now confronted with difficult and far-reaching questions:
 How to achieve atonement without the Temple?
 How to explain the disastrous outcome of the rebellion?
 How to live in the post-Temple, Romanized world?
 How to connect present and past traditions?
Regardless of the importance they gave to the Temple, and despite their support of Bar Koseba's revolt, the Pharisees' vision of Jewish law as a means by which ordinary people could engage with the sacred in their daily lives provided them with a position from which to respond to all four challenges in a way meaningful to the vast majority of Jews. Their responses would constitute Rabbinic Judaism.

After the destruction of the Second Temple, these sectarian divisions ended. The Rabbis avoided the term "Pharisee," perhaps because it was a term more often used by non-Pharisees, but also because the term was explicitly sectarian. This shift by no means resolved conflicts over the interpretation of the Torah; rather, it relocated debates between sects to debates within Rabbinic Judaism. The Pharisaic commitment to scholarly debate as a value in and of itself, rather than merely a byproduct of sectarianism, emerged as a defining feature of Rabbinic Judaism.

Thus, as the Pharisees argued that all Israel should act as priests, the Rabbis argued that all Israel should act as rabbis: "The rabbis furthermore want to transform the entire Jewish community into an academy where the whole Torah is studied and kept .... redemption depends on the "rabbinization" of all Israel, that is, upon the attainment of all Jewry of a full and complete embodiment of revelation or Torah, thus achieving a perfect replica of heaven."

The Rabbinic era itself is divided into two periods. The first period was that of the Tannaim (from the Aramaic word for "repeat;" the Aramaic root TNY is equivalent to the Hebrew root SNY, which is the basis for "Mishnah." Thus, Tannaim are "Mishnah teachers"), the sages who repeated and thus passed down the Oral Torah. During this period rabbis finalized the canonization of the Tanakh, and in 200 Judah haNasi edited together Tannaitic judgements and traditions into the Mishnah, considered by the rabbis to be the definitive expression of the Oral Torah (although some of the sages mentioned in the Mishnah are Pharisees who lived prior to the destruction of the Second Temple, or prior to the Bar Kozeba Revolt, most of the sages mentioned lived after the revolt).

The second period is that of the Amoraim (from the Aramaic word for "speaker") rabbis and their students who continued to debate legal matters and discuss the meaning of the books of the Bible. In Palestine, these discussions occurred at important academies at Tiberias, Caesarea, and Sepphoris. In Babylonia, these discussions largely occurred at important academies that had been established at Nehardea, Pumpeditha and Sura. This tradition of study and debate reached its fullest expression in the development of the Talmudim, elaborations of the Mishnah and records of Rabbinic debates, stories, and judgements, compiled around 400 in Palestine and around 500 in Babylon.

Rabbinic Judaism eventually emerged as normative Judaism and in fact many today refer to Rabbinic Judaism simply as "Judaism." Jacob Neusner, however, states that the Amoraim had no ultimate power in their communities. They lived at a time when Jews were subjects of either the Roman or Iranian (Parthian and Persian) empires. These empires left the day-to-day governance in the hands of the Jewish authorities: in Roman Palestine, through the hereditary office of Patriarch (simultaneously the head of the Sanhedrin); in Babylonia, through the hereditary office of the Reish Galuta, the "Head of the Exile" or "Exilarch" (who ratified the appointment of the heads of Rabbinical academies.) According to Professor Neusner:

In Neusner's view, the rabbinic project, as acted out in the Talmud, reflected not the world as it was but the world as rabbis dreamed it should be.

According to S. Baron however, there existed "a general willingness of the people to follow its self imposed Rabbinic rulership". Although the Rabbis lacked authority to impose capital punishment "Flagellation and heavy fines, combined with an extensive system of excommunication were more than enough to uphold the authority of the courts." In fact, the Rabbis took over more and more power from the Reish Galuta until eventually R' Ashi assumed the title Rabbana, heretofore assumed by the exilarch, and appeared together with two other Rabbis as an official delegation "at the gate of King Yazdegard's court." The Amorah (and Tanna) Rav was a personal friend of the last Parthian king Artabenus and Shmuel was close to Shapur I, King of Persia. Thus, the Rabbis had significant means of "coercion" and the people seem to have followed the Rabbinic rulership.

Pharisees and Christianity

The Pharisees appear in the New Testament, engaging in conflicts between themselves and John the Baptist and with Jesus, and because Nicodemus the Pharisee (John 3:1) with Joseph of Arimathea entombed Jesus' body at great personal risk. Gamaliel, the highly respected rabbi and, according to Christianity, defender of the apostles, was also a Pharisee, and according to some Christian traditions secretly converted to Christianity.

There are several references in the New Testament to Paul the Apostle being a Pharisee before converting to Christianity, and other members of the Pharisee sect are known from Acts 15:5 to have become Christian believers. It was some members of his group who argued that gentile converts must be circumcised and obliged to follow the Mosaic law, leading to a dispute within the early Church addressed at the Apostolic Council in Jerusalem, in 50 CE.

The New Testament, particularly the Synoptic Gospels, presents especially the leadership of the Pharisees as obsessed with man-made rules (especially concerning purity) whereas Jesus is more concerned with God's love; the Pharisees scorn sinners whereas Jesus seeks them out. (The Gospel of John, which is the only gospel where Nicodemus is mentioned, particularly portrays the sect as divided and willing to debate.) Because of the New Testament's frequent depictions of Pharisees as self-righteous rule-followers (see also Woes of the Pharisees and Legalism (theology)), the word "pharisee" (and its derivatives: "pharisaical", etc.) has come into semi-common usage in English to describe a hypocritical and arrogant person who places the letter of the law above its spirit. Jews today typically find this insulting and some consider the use of the word to be anti-Semitic.

Hyam Maccoby speculated that Jesus was himself a Pharisee and that his arguments with Pharisees is a sign of inclusion rather than fundamental conflict (disputation being the dominant narrative mode employed in the Talmud as a search for truth, and not necessarily a sign of opposition). However, Maccoby's views have been widely rejected by scholars.

Examples of disputed passages include the story of Jesus declaring the sins of a paralytic man forgiven and the Pharisees calling the action blasphemy. In the story, Jesus counters the accusation that he does not have the power to forgive sins by pronouncing forgiveness of sins and then healing the man. The account of the Paralytic Man and Jesus's performance of miracles on the Sabbath are often interpreted as oppositional and at times antagonistic to that of the Pharisees' teachings.

However, according to E.P. Sanders, Jesus' actions are actually similar to and consistent with Jewish beliefs and practices of the time, as recorded by the Rabbis, that commonly associate illness with sin and healing with forgiveness. Jews (according to E.P. Sanders) reject the New Testament suggestion that the healing would have been critical of, or criticized by, the Pharisees as no surviving Rabbinic source questions or criticizes this practice, and the notion that Pharisees believed that "God alone" could forgive sins is more of a rhetorical device than historical fact. Another argument from Sanders is that, according to the New Testament, Pharisees wanted to punish Jesus for healing a man's withered hand on Sabbath. Despite the Mishna and Gemara being replete with restrictions on healing on the Sabbath (for example, Mishna Shabbat, 22:6), E.P. Sanders stated that no Rabbinic rule has been found according to which Jesus would have violated Sabbath.

Paula Frederiksen and Michael J. Cook believe that those passages of the New Testament that are seemingly most hostile to the Pharisees were written sometime after the destruction of Herod's Temple in 70 CE. Only Christianity and Pharisaism survived the destruction of the Temple, and the two competed for a short time until the Pharisees emerged as the dominant form of Judaism . When many Jews did not convert, Christians sought new converts from among the Gentiles.

Some scholars have found evidence of continuous interactions between Jewish-Christian and rabbinic movements from the mid to late second century to the fourth century.

See also
 Criticism of the Talmud
 The Seekers after Smooth Things
 Tannaim
 Woes of the Pharisees

Footnotes

References
 Baron, Salo W. A Social and Religious History of the Jews Vol 2.
 Boccaccini, Gabriele 2002 Roots of Rabbinic Judaism 
 Bruce, F.F., The Book of Acts, Revised Edition (Grand Rapids: William B. Eerdmans Publishing Company, 1988)
 Cohen, Shaye J.D. 1988 From the Maccabees to the Mishnah 
 Fredriksen, Paula 1988 From Jesus to Christ 
 Gowler, David B. 1991/2008 Host, Guest, Enemy, and Friend: Portraits of the Pharisees in Luke and Acts (Peter Lang, 1991; ppk, Wipf & Stock, 2008)
 Halevi, Yitzchak Isaac Dorot Ha'Rishonim (Heb.)
 Neusner, Jacob Torah From our Sages: Pirke Avot 
 Neusner, Jacob Invitation to the Talmud: a Teaching Book (1998) 
 Roth, Cecil A History of the Jews: From Earliest Times Through the Six Day War 1970 
 Schwartz, Leo, ed. Great Ages and Ideas of the Jewish People 
 Segal, Alan F. Rebecca's Children: Judaism and Christianity in the Roman World, Harvard University Press, 1986, 
 Sacchi, Paolo 2004 The History of the Second Temple Period, London [u.a.] : T & T Clark International, 2004,

External links

 Resources > Second Temple and Talmudic Era > Jewish Sects The Jewish History Resource Center – Project of the Dinur Center for Research in Jewish History, The Hebrew University of Jerusalem
 Jewish Encyclopedia: Pharisees
 
 
 Letchford, Roderick R., Pharisees, Jesus and the Kingdom (2001), Australian National University.

Further reading
  Discussion of the book by Israel Knohl, The Messiah Controversy (מחלוקת המשיח): Who Are the Jews Waiting For? (Tel Aviv: Dvir Press, 2019, in Hebrew), supporting the thesis that the priests who sentenced Jesus to death were Sadducees, in a time where the majority of the Jews followed the beliefs of the Pharisees, who were close to the ideas preached by Jesus and would not have wanted his death.

 
2nd-century BC establishments
70s disestablishments in the Roman Empire
2nd-century BCE Judaism
1st-century BCE Judaism
1st-century Judaism
Jewish religious movements
Oral Torah
Pharisees
Israelites